We Need Love is the third single album by South Korean girl group STAYC. It was released by High Up Entertainment on July 19, 2022, and contains four tracks, including the lead single "Beautiful Monster".

Background and release
On June 30, 2022, High Up Entertainment announced STAYC will be releasing a new album in July 2022. A day later, it was announced STAYC would be releasing their third single album titled We Need Love on July 19. On July 5, the album teaser video was released, followed by the promotional schedule a day later. On July 15, the highlight medley video was released with "Beautiful Monster" announced as the lead single. Three days later, the music video teaser for "Beautiful Monster" was released.

Reception

Tanu I. Raj of NME stated that "We Need Love played safe leaving much to be desired as a whole" as the single album "is missing the experimental streak STAYC have become synonymous with [and] the complexity in the story they [have] build". Overall, he stated that "We Need Love is a fitting summer album in the sense that the memories won't linger till the next [season]".

Promotion
Prior to the single album's release, STAYC held a live showcase to introduce the single album and communicate with their fans.

Track listing

Credits and personnel
Credits adapted from single album's liner notes.

Studios
 Ingrid Studio – recording, digital editing 
 Vanguard Town – digital editing 
 Koko Sound Studio – mixing 
 The Mastering Place – mastering 
 Metropolis Mastering Studios – mastering 

Personnel
 STAYC (Sumin, Sieun, Isa, Seeun, Yoon, J) – vocals, background vocals 
 Ashley Alisha – background vocals 
 STAYC (Sieun) – background vocals 
 Flyt – background vocals , arrangement , bass , drums , keyboard , production 
 Black Eyed Pilseung – lyrics, composition, production 
 Jeon Goon – lyrics, composition, production 
 Rado – arrangement , drums , keyboard , guitar , digital editing 
 Tak – drums, keyboard, bass 
 Jeong Eun-kyung – recording, digital editing 
 Yang Young-eun – recording 
 Drk – mixing 
 Kim Jun-sang – mixing (assistant) 
 Ji Min-woo – mixing (assistant) 
 On Seong-yoon – mixing (assistant) 
 Kim Joon-young – mixing (assistant) 
 Dave Kutch – mastering 
 Stuart Hawkes – mastering

Charts

Weekly charts

Monthly charts

Year-end chart

Certifications and sales

Release history

References

STAYC albums
Single albums
Korean-language albums